Paratheria is a genus of African and Caribbean plants in the grass family.

 Species
 Paratheria glaberrima C.E.Hubb. – Sierra Leone, Republic of the Congo
 Paratheria prostrata Griseb. – Sub-Saharan Africa from Senegal to Ethiopia to Namibia and Madagascar; Costa Rica, Cuba, Hispaniola, Colombia, Venezuela, Guyana, French Guiana, Bolivia, Brazil

References

Panicoideae
Poaceae genera